Alberto Gandossi (born 31 January 1933) was an Italian Grand Prix motorcycle road racer. His best year was in 1958 when he rode a Ducati to two Grand Prix victories and finished second to Carlo Ubbiali in the 125cc world championship.

References

1933 births
Italian motorcycle racers
125cc World Championship riders
Living people